Villa Settefinestre lies between Capalbio and  Orbetello in Tuscany, Italy, and is the site of a late Republican Roman slave-run villa owned by the senatorial family of the Volusii, built in the 1st century BC and enlarged in the 1st century AD with a large cryptoportico. The villa was fortified at a later period and the fortress was rebuilt as a villa in the more modern sense in the 15th century. It was excavated during 1976-1981 under the direction of Andrea Carandini and very thoroughly published. Villa Settefinestre itself was rehabilitated in the 1970s as a luxury holiday rental property, with the ruins, open to the public, picturesquely incorporated in the garden plan.

The villa was located in the Ager Cosanus in the vicinity of Cosa, a Latin colonia founded in 273 BC. The area was linked to Rome by the Via Aurelia. Cosa suffered a crisis in the Roman Republican civil wars and became depopulated. In its stead, a group of great villas were assembled in the area, run by slave labor not unlike the latifundia holdings typical of southern Italy. The villa at Settefinestre was not the peristyle villa described by Pliny the Elder or to be seen at Herculaneum, filled with sculpture, mosaic floors and fine paintings. Nor was it in any way like the Imperial villas round the Bay of Naples, of course, though the sea is visible from its site.  This was Roman agrobusiness: instead of fine mosaics, a wealth of Roman tools have been recovered here (Settefinestre vol. III). "Settefinestre has been taken as an example of how the advice of Roman agricultural writers like Columella and Varro were put into practice. "It is truly remarkable how well this villa, with its extensive repertoire of buildings and forms, instantiates the accounts of the Roman agronomists: the best example of Varro's villa perfecta (I, 194). In detail after detail the advice of Varro and Columella is to be found in practice here" (Purcell, reviewing the published official reports). The commercial product of Roman Villa Settefinestre was wine.

Aside from the villa at Settefinestre, there are remains of comparable contemporary villas at Cap Colonne and Provincia.

The exemplary archaeological excavations at Settefinestre have been taken as a starting point for the new phase of science-supported field archaeology in Italian work that is providing a more detailed study of the occupation history of the Roman countryside and moves beyond the antiquarian tradition of villa-studies.

Sources
Settefinestre: Una Villa Schiavistica Nell'Etruria Romana edited A. Carandini and A Ricci, (Modena, 1985) : several lavish volumes present the detailed report of the archaeology.
Annalisa Marzano, Roman Villas in Central Italy: A Social and Economic History. (Brill, 2007)

References

External links
Via Aurelia
Maria Letizia Gualandi. "SETTEFINESTRE" In Enciclopedia Italiana - V Appendice (1994).

Roman villas in Italy
Archaeological sites in Tuscany
Orbetello
Capalbio